is a former Japanese football player.

Playing career
Miyazaki was born in Fukuoka Prefecture on June 24, 1977. After graduating from Kwansei Gakuin University, he joined J1 League club Kyoto Purple Sanga in 2000. He became a regular player as right side midfielder. However he could hardly play in the match from summer 2000 and the club was relegated to J2 League from 2001. He could hardly play in the match in 2001 and retired end of 2001 season.

Club statistics

References

External links

kyotosangadc

1977 births
Living people
Kwansei Gakuin University alumni
Association football people from Fukuoka Prefecture
Japanese footballers
J1 League players
J2 League players
Kyoto Sanga FC players
Association football midfielders